Elizabeth or Elisabeth may refer to:

People
 Elizabeth (given name), a female given name (including people with that name)
 Elizabeth (biblical figure), mother of John the Baptist
 Queen Elizabeth (disambiguation)

Ships
 HMS Elizabeth, several ships
 Elisabeth (schooner), several ships
 Elizabeth (freighter), an American freighter that was wrecked off New York harbor in 1850; see

Places

Australia
 City of Elizabeth
 Elizabeth, South Australia
 Elizabeth Reef, a coral reef in the Tasman Sea

United States
 Elizabeth, Arkansas
 Elizabeth, Colorado
 Elizabeth, Georgia
 Elizabeth, Illinois
 Elizabeth, Indiana
 Hopkinsville, Kentucky, originally known as Elizabeth
 Elizabeth, Louisiana
 Elizabeth Islands, Massachusetts
 Elizabeth, Minnesota
 Elizabeth, New Jersey, largest city with the name in the U.S.
 Elizabeth City, North Carolina
 Elizabeth (Charlotte neighborhood), North Carolina
 Elizabeth, Pennsylvania
 Elizabeth Township, Pennsylvania (disambiguation)
 Elizabeth, West Virginia

Film and television
 Elizabeth R, 1971
 Elizabeth (TV series), 1980
 Elizabeth (film), 1998
 Elizabeth: The Golden Age, 2007

Music
 Elizabeth (band), an American psychedelic rock/progressive rock band active from 1967 to 1970
 Elisabeth (album), a 1990 album by Elisabeth Andreassen
 Elizabeth (Lisa album)
 Elizabeth, an album by Killah Priest
 "Elizabeth" (Ghost song)
 "Elizabeth" (The Statler Brothers song)
 Elizabeth (soundtrack), to the 1998 film

Other uses
 "Elizabeth", a poem by Edgar Allan Poe
 Elisabeth (musical), a 1992 Viennese German-language musical written by Michael Kunze and composed by Sylvester Levay, about the life of Elisabeth of Bavaria
 Elizabeth (BioShock), a fictional character in BioShock
 Elisabeth (Antwerp premetro station)
 Elisabeth metro station, (a part of) a metro station in Brussels

See also
 
 Elizabeth I (disambiguation)
 Elizabeth II (disambiguation)
 Queen Elizabeth (disambiguation)
 Elizabeth Cup (disambiguation)
 Elizabeth Stakes (disambiguation)
 Elizaveta (disambiguation)
 Elisaveta (disambiguation)
 Jelisaveta (disambiguation)